Love Me Right is the first album from the electronic music group Angel City, also known as Zentveld & Oomen.

Featuring the vocals of Lara McAllen, the album was released in 2005. It sold 60,000 copies in the UK.

Track listing
"Love Me Right (Oh Sheila)"
"I Won't Let You Down"
"Do You Know (I Go Crazy)"
"Sunrise"
"Touch Me (All Night Long)"
"City Lights"
"Stay"
"Back in Time"
"Stars"
"Calling You"
"Confession"

Bonus tracks:
"Love Me Right (Oh Sheila)" (Mike Di Scala Remix)
"I Won't Let You Down" (Dee - Luxe Club Mix)
"Sunrise" (Yanou's Sunset Remix)

References

2005 debut albums